The Town Clock Church, now the Second Baptist Church of New Albany, Indiana, United States, is a historic church located at 300 East Main Street, within the New Albany Downtown Historic District. It was constructed in 1852 as Second Presbyterian Church, in what was then the largest city in Indiana. It is near the Ohio River, across the border from Louisville, Kentucky.

It was a station on the Underground Railroad.

The church is brick, and is constructed in the Greek Revival style of architecture. It previously had a 160-foot high clock tower that could be seen by boat crews on the Ohio River.  However, the tower has been shortened. The first phase of reconstruction is underway which will include a new steeple and clock faces. When reconstruction is complete, the tower will once again be 160 feet tall.

References

External links
 Second Baptist short history
 List of Underground Railroad sites

Buildings and structures in New Albany, Indiana
Churches on the Underground Railroad
Churches on the National Register of Historic Places in Indiana
National Register of Historic Places in Floyd County, Indiana
Clock towers in Indiana
Underground Railroad in Indiana
Historic district contributing properties in Indiana
Churches completed in 1937
1937 establishments in Indiana